Martin Andreas Studach (17 May 1944 – 24 March 2007) was a Swiss rower who competed in the 1964 Summer Olympics and the 1968 Summer Olympics.

Studach was born in Küsnacht, Zurich, the son of Eugen Studach who had been a champion single sculler in the 1930s and 1940s. He rowed for Grasshopper Club, Zurich. Studach partnered Melchior Bürgin in the Double scull rowing for Switzerland at the 1964 Summer Olympics in Tokyo when they came fourth. At the age of 20, Studach was Switzerland's youngest competitor. Over next three years, Studach and Burgin dominated the double sculls scene. In 1965 they won the Double Sculls Challenge Cup at Henley Royal Regatta.  and the European Championships.  In 1966 they won the World Championships. They won the European Championships and the Double Sculls at Henley again in 1967, and Studach also won the Diamond Challenge Sculls beating Jochen Meißner in the final that year. Studach had a reputation for driving himself hard. Studach and Burgin rowed in the Double Scull again for Switzerland at the 1968 Summer Olympics, but at the altitude in Mexico Studach suffered a collapse through over-exertion in the heats.

Studach died of a heart attack at the age of 62 after finishing an outing in a double scull in Zürich, Switzerland.

References

External links
 

1944 births
2007 deaths
Swiss male rowers
People from Küsnacht
Olympic rowers of Switzerland
Rowers at the 1964 Summer Olympics
Rowers at the 1968 Summer Olympics
World Rowing Championships medalists for Switzerland
European Rowing Championships medalists
Sportspeople from the canton of Zürich